Mark Napper O'Connor Tandy is an Irish stage, film and television actor.

Early life 
Mark Tandy was born in Athlone, County Westmeath, Ireland on 8February 1957. His childhood was spent between the Republic of Ireland and the Persian Gulf. He was educated at Winchester College and the University of Bristol Drama Department, and was a member of the National Youth Theatre from 1974 to 1976. He is a descendant of Napper Tandy, the Irish revolutionary leader and founding member of the United Irishmen.

Career 
His first professional engagement in the theatre was for the Royal Shakespeare Company at Stratford-upon-Avon, England in 1979, where appearances included the original stage production of The Life and Adventures of Nicholas Nickleby, which played for three seasons at the Aldwych Theatre, London and at the Plymouth Theatre, New York. Tandy has since appeared irregularly at the National Theatre, the Royal Court Theatre, The Old Vic, London's West End and around the UK.

His first television role was as WB Yeats for the BBC in 1982 and many subsequent television appearances include The Jewel in the Crown, Inspector Morse, Portrait of a Marriage, Poirot, Absolutely Fabulous, The Buccaneers, Longitude, Evolution: Darwin's Dangerous Idea and Shackleton. Tandy appears as Cecil Beaton in the first two seasons of The Crown for Netflix.

He first appeared on film as Viscount Risley in Merchant Ivory's Maurice. Other film appearances include Howards End, Defence of the Realm, Wings of Fame, Luzhin Defence, Bridget Jones: The Edge of Reason, Tristam Shandy: A Cock and Bull Story and Dad's Army.

Selected filmography

The Jewel in the Crown (1984, TV Series) - Gerry
Murder Not Proven (1984, TV Series) - Edwin Rose
Defence of the Realm (1985) - Philip Henderson
Captive (1986) - Hammond
Call Me Mister (1986, TV Series) - Sheridan Thurleigh
Hedgehog Wedding (1987, TV Series) - Jamie
Maurice (1987) - Lord Risley
Hannay (1988, TV Series) - Cully
Catherine (1988, TV Movie) - Dr Wishart
A Vote for Hitler (1988, TV Movie) - Frank Pakenham
Inspector Morse (1989, TV Series) - Mr. Collins
Saracen (1989, TV Series) - Miles Gordon
Wings of Fame (1990) - The Composer
Portrait of a Marriage (1990, TV Mini-Series) - Reggie Cooper
Duel of Hearts (1991, TV Movie) - Jackson
A Time To Dance (1992, TV Mini-Series) - Professor Adams
As Time Goes By (1992, TV Series) - Chas
Howards End (1992) - Luncheon Guests
The Railway Station Man (1992) - Manus Dempsey
So Haunt Me (1993, TV Series) - Tom
Eye of the Storm (1993, TV Mini-Series) - Barnes
Absolutely Fabulous (1994, TV Series) - Mark
Fall from Grace (1994, TV Movie) - Pilot
Agatha Christie's Poirot (1995, Episode: "Hercule Poirot's Christmas") - Superintendent Sugden
The Buccaneers (1995, TV Mini-Series) - Lord Seadown
Kiss and Tell (1996, TV Movie) - Cheeseman
A Touch of Frost (1997, TV Series) - Hotel Manager
Food of Love (1997) - Robin
Killer Net (1998, TV Mini-Series) - Robin Butler-Cook
Liverpool One (1998, TV Series) - Guy Andrews
Sophie's World (1998) - William Shakespeare
The Waiting Time (1999, TV Movie) - Peter Vansittart
Longitude (2000, TV Movie) - William Whiston
The Luzhin Defence (2000) - Luzhin's father
Claim (2002) - Peter van Hooijdonk
The Biographer (2002, TV Movie) - Humphrey Craven
Shackleton (2002, TV Mini-Series) - Frank Shackleton
Evolution: Darwin's Dangerous Idea (2002, TV Mini-Series documentary) - Erasmus Darwin
The Alan Clark Diaries (2004, TV Series) - Donald Derx
Bridget Jones: The Edge of Reason (2004) - Derek
Space Odyssey: Voyage To The Planets (2004, TV Movie) - Alex Lloyd, Chief Scientist
Cherished (2005, TV Movie) - Paul Dunkels QC
Hustle (2005, TV Series) - Gideon
A Cock and Bull Story (2005) - London Doctor
Hex (2005, TV Series) - Titus Peckham
The Impressionists (2006, TV Series) - Judge #2
Trial and Retribution (2007, TV Series) - Dr John Saunders
New Tricks (2007, TV Series) - Colin Meadows
The Unsinkable Titanic (2008, TV Movie documentary) - J. Bruce Ismay
Minder (2009, TV Series) - Auctioneer
Garrow's Law (2009, TV Series) - Dr. Herring
Mr. Nice (2010) - Lord Hutchison QC
Silk (2011, TV Series) - Judge Stephen Morris
The Deep Blue Sea (2011) - Ede & Ravenscroft Assistant
The Hollow Crown (2012, TV Series) - Sir Richard Vernon
Silent Witness episode: "Coup de Grace" (2 parts) (2014, Series) - QC Harry Fraser
Dad's Army (2016) - Major Cunningham
The Limehouse Golem (2016) - Judge
Goodbye Christopher Robin (2016) - Portrait Photographer
The Foreigner (2016) - Simpson
The Crown (2016-2017, TV Series) - Cecil Beaton
The Last Post (2017, TV Mini-Series) - Colin Calvert
Surviving Christmas with the Relatives (2018) - Vicar

Selected Theatre 
Nicholas Nickleby (1980) - Bolder, Mr. Pyke, Policeman, Master Crummles [Royal Shakespeare Company]
Major Barbara (1982) - Charles Lomax [National Theatre]
The Lucky Chance (1984) - Bredwell [Royal Court Theatre]
The Importance of Being Earnest (1985) - John Worthing [Oxford Playhouse]
Beauty and The Beast (1987) - Nosail [Old Vic]
Siblings (1987) - Gerard [Lyric Theatre Hammersmith]
Lady Windermere's Fan (1986) - Cecil Graham [Bristol Old Vic]
Balmoral (1987) - Godfrey Winn [Bristol Old Vic]
A Study in Scarlet (1989) - Sherlock Holmes [Greenwich Theatre]
Beside Herself (1990) - Teddy [Royal Court Theatre]
The Clandestine Marriage (1991) - John Melvil [Bristol Old Vic]
Reflected Glory (1992) - James [Vaudeville Theatre]
The Mountain Giants (1993) - The Count [National Theatre]
A Voyage Round My Father (1995) - Son [Theatre Royal Bath]
Sweet Panic (1996) - Martin [Hampstead Theatre]
Luther (2001) - Pope Leo X [National Theatre]
Richard II (2005) - Scroop [Old Vic Theatre]
The Years Between -(2007) Michael [Orange Tree Theatre]
The Voysey Inheritance - (2005) Trenchard Voysey [National Theatre]
Mrs. Warren's Profession (2009) - Praed [Comedy Theatre]
Racing Demon (2011) - Bishop of Kingston [Crucible Theatre Sheffield]
Lot And His God (2012) - Lot [The Print Room]
Eldorado (2014) - Aschenbrenner [The Arcola]
The Philanderer (2016) - Cuthbertson [Orange Tree Theatre]

References

External links

Mark Tandy on BFI

1957 births
Living people
Irish male television actors
Irish male film actors
People from Athlone